Khaziriat (also Romanized as Khaẕīrīāt, Khazīrīāt, and Khazīrīyāt; also known as Khadairāth, Khafīrīyāt, Khazarīāt, Khaẕrīāt, Kheẕerīāt, Khezeryāt, and Khezīrīyāt) is a village in Abdoliyeh-ye Gharbi Rural District, in the Central District of Ramshir County, Khuzestan Province, Iran. At the 2006 census, its population was 44, in 7 families.

References 

Populated places in Ramshir County